Hans R. Paschen (5 February 1896 – 28 May 1960) was a sailor from Germany, who represented his country at the 1928 Summer Olympics in Amsterdam, Netherlands.

Sources 
 

1896 births
1960 deaths
Sailors at the 1928 Summer Olympics – 6 Metre
Olympic sailors of Germany
German male sailors (sport)